Bolgatty Palace is a former palace built by the Dutch in India on Bolgatty Island in Kochi, Kerala.

History 
One of the oldest existing Dutch palaces outside Holland, the palace was built in 1744 by Dutch traders and later extended and gardens were landscaped around it. The building was then the Governor's palace for the commander of Dutch Malabar, and in 1909 was leased to the British. It served as the home of the British governors, being the seat of the British Resident of Cochin during the British Raj.

In 1947, when India attained independence, the palace became the property of the state and was converted into a heritage hotel resort.

Facilities 
Bolgatty Palace has a swimming pool, 9-hole golf course, ayurvedic centre, and daily Kathakali performances and is a holiday destination for tourists. There is in a temple dedicated to Shiva that is the first of its kind in Kerala.

Gallery

See also 
 Government Houses of India
 Government Houses of the British Empire

References

External links 

 Official Website

British Empire
Palaces in Kochi
Heritage hotels in India
Hotels in Kochi
Dutch India
Houses completed in 1744
1744 establishments in India
1744 establishments in the Dutch Empire